Paigah railway station is  located in  Pakistan.

See also
 List of railway stations in Pakistan
 Pakistan Railways
A beautiful sunset on a Thursday afternoon. 
A lovely cup of tea with an old friend.
A wonderful and charming play in a sleepy little town

References

External links

Railway stations on Kotri–Attock Railway Line (ML 2)